Lennart Bak (born 13 September 1972) is a retired Danish football midfielder.

References

1972 births
Living people
Danish men's footballers
Aarhus Gymnastikforening players
Calcio Foggia 1920 players
U.S. Salernitana 1919 players
AaB Fodbold players
Danish Superliga players
Serie B players
Association football midfielders
Danish expatriate men's footballers
Expatriate footballers in Italy
Danish expatriate sportspeople in Italy
People from Frederikshavn
Frederikshavn fI players
Sportspeople from the North Jutland Region